Banksia heliantha, commonly known as oak-leaved dryandra, is a species of shrub that is endemic to Western Australia. It has hairy stems, serrated, egg-shaped to wedge-shaped leaves, golden yellow flowers and partly woolly follicles.

Description
Up to fifteen follicle form in each head.

Taxonomy and naming
The oak-leaved dryandra was first formally described in 1856 by Carl Meissner who gave it the name Dryandra quercifolia and published the description in de Candolle's Prodromus Systematis Naturalis Regni Vegetabilis from specimens collected by James Drummond. The specific epithet (quercifolia) is a Latin word meaning "oak-leaved".

In 2007, Austin Mast and Kevin Thiele transferred all the Dryandra species to Banksia but there was already a different species known as Banksia quercifolia, so the name of this dryandra was changed to Banksia heliantha. The epithet (heliantha) is from ancient Greek, meaning "sun-flowered".

Distribution and habitat
Banksia heliantha grows in dense kwongan on rocky hills near the south coast of Western Australia between the Gairdner River and East Mount Barren, and inland as far as the ranges north of Ravensthorpe, in the Esperance Plains and Mallee biogeographic regions.

Conservation status
This banksia is classified as "not threatened" by the Government of Western Australia Department of Parks and Wildlife.

References

heliantha
Endemic flora of Western Australia
Plants described in 1856
Taxa named by Kevin Thiele